Thomas Miller (8 March 1883 – 20 October 1962) was an English cricketer. Miller was a right-handed batsman who bowled right-arm fast. He was born at Mindelo in the Cape Verde Islands.

Educated at Clifton College, Miller made his first-class debut for Gloucestershire against Middlesex at Lord's in the 1902 County Championship. His next first-class appearance came in the 1910 County Championship against Somerset. He made sixteen further first-class appearances for Gloucestershire, the last of which came against Sussex in the 1914 County Championship. In his total of eighteen first-class matches, he scored 406 runs at an average of 13.09, with a high score of 35. With the ball, he took 4 wickets at a bowling average of 63.25, with best figures of 2/5.

He died at Goring-on-Thames, Oxfordshire on 20 October 1962. His uncle Audley Miller played Test cricket for England.

References

External links
Thomas Miller at ESPNcricinfo
Thomas Miller at CricketArchive

1883 births
1962 deaths
People from Mindelo
People educated at Clifton College
English cricketers
Gloucestershire cricketers
British expatriates in Portugal